Zabrodje is an ordinary chondrite that fell through a roof of a house in the village of , Stowbtsy District (then part of the Russian Empire, now Belarus) approximately two hours before dawn on 22 September 1893. 

Only one fragment was recovered. Initial studies of the meteorite were conducted by professor Romul Alexandrovitch von Prendel of the Odessa University. He took  for analysis; after his studies he deposited the remaining  at the Odessa University. The main mass of  ended up at the Museum of Antiquities in Vilnius.

Other fragments are held:  at the Odessa University,  at the Russian Academy of Sciences,  at the Geological Survey of Canada,  at the Natural History Museum in Vienna,  at the National Museum of Natural History in Paris, Field Museum of Natural History in Chicago, and Natural History Museum in Berlin,  at the Natural History Museum in London, and others.

References

External links
 Zabrodje at the Meteoritical Bulletin Database
 Zabrodje, Belarus: A Hundred Year Old House Hammerer
 Zabrodje at wiki.Meteoritica.pl (in Polish)

September 1893 events
1893 in the Russian Empire
1893 in science
Meteorites found in Belarus